Smychka is a rural locality (a khutor) in Savinskoye Rural Settlement, Pallasovsky District, Volgograd Oblast, Russia. The population was 271 as of 2010. There are 3 streets.

Geography 
Smychka is located on the left bank of the Torgun River, 24 km northeast of Pallasovka (the district's administrative centre) by road. Savinka is the nearest rural locality.

References 

Rural localities in Pallasovsky District